Obere Aller is a Verbandsgemeinde ("collective municipality") in the Börde district in Saxony-Anhalt, Germany. Before 1 January 2010, it was a Verwaltungsgemeinschaft. It is situated approximately 30 km west of Magdeburg. It is named after the upper course of the river Aller, in its territory. The seat of the Verbandsgemeinde is in Eilsleben.

The Verbandsgemeinde Obere Aller consists of the following municipalities:

 Eilsleben
 Harbke
 Hötensleben
 Sommersdorf
 Ummendorf
 Völpke
 Wefensleben

References

Verbandsgemeinden in Saxony-Anhalt
Börde (district)